Equitable Life Assurance Society v Hyman [2000] UKHL 39 is an English contract law case, concerning implied terms.

Facts
Equitable Life (est 1762) issued ‘with profits’ life assurance policies, which are a way of saving for retirement. If policy holders took benefits as a taxable annuity (i.e. with a payment annually), then they got tax exemptions on the premiums (and bonuses at the end of the year). They could choose to have their annuity at a "guaranteed annual rate" ("GAR") that would be fixed, or a "current annuity rate" ("CAR") that would fluctuate according to the market. The choice did not affect the premium. From 1993 the current annuity fell below the guaranteed one. Article 65 of the Equitable Life's Articles of Association said the directors could, at their discretion, vary bonuses and the company had relied on this since its foundation.

The directors of Equitable Life decided they would reduce the level of terminal bonuses for GAR policyholders, from the higher figure shown on the GAR policyholders' annual bonus notices, to  a lower figure (if necessary to zero) so as to equalise the benefits so far as possible i.e. the policy proceeds with the higher terminal bonus times the CAR rate equalled the policy proceeds with lower terminal bonus times the GAR rate (the Differential Terminal Bonus Policy - DTBP). The Equitable's Annual Regulatory Returns, submitted each year to the regulatory authorities (the Department of Trade and Industry - DTI) had set out this practice since the 1993 (when the current annuity rate first fell below the guaranteed annuity rate). The Equitable's Annual Regulatory Returns had been scrutinized each year by the regulatory authorities and nothing adverse had been said by the regulatory authorities about the Equitable's Differential Terminal Bonus Policy (which had been introduced in 1993).

In 1998, because the GAR policyholders received a lower terminal bonus than they expected (they expected the higher terminal bonus and, in addition, the GAR rate) certain GAR policyholders complained. Mr Hyman was a representative policyholder. At no point, however, were the GAR policyholders ever paid less per annum (and nor was there ever any intention by the directors of Equitable Life to pay them less) than their guaranteed fund (i.e. excluding the non-contractual terminal bonus) times guaranteed annuity rate.

Judgment
The House of Lords unanimously agreed that there was an implied term in the Articles of Association such that the directors of Equitable Life could not exercise their discretion in the way they had because it defeated the reasonable expectations of the GAR policyholders as exemplified by Equitable having quoted the higher terminal bonus on each GAR policyholders' annual bonus notice (no other life office had quoted terminal bonus in its annual bonus notices to policyholders as terminal bonus can only be determined at policy maturity because of the volatility of financial markets). Although there was no express term in Equitable Life's constitution that constrained the discretion of the directors, it was necessary to imply such a term to uphold the policyholders' reasonable expectations. Lord Steyn gave the leading judgment.

Lord Cooke added that the discretion could be struck down, no matter how broadly it was drafted, in the same way as happens in administrative law (Padfield v Minister of Agriculture) and private law (Howard Smith Ltd v Ampol Ltd). The result of the discretion would not be consistent with the purpose of the policy.

Lords Slynn, Hoffmann and Hobhouse concurred with both. £1.5b of annuities needed to be paid in full.

Significance
Equitable Life almost collapsed after the case, because it was unable to meet its additional liability to GAR policyholders, and had to sell assets and close to new business. It triggered an explosion of litigation and bitter recrimination among policyholders, directors, auditors, regulators and the government.

See also

Scally v Southern Health and Social Services Board [1992] 1 AC 294
Crossley v Faithful & Gould Holdings Ltd [2004] EWCA Civ 293
Attorney General of Belize v Belize Telecom Ltd [2009] UKPC 10
Equitable Life (Payments) Act 2010

References 

English contract case law
2000 in case law
House of Lords cases
2000 in British law